FPO may refer to:

 ASL Airlines France (ICAO code)
 Fareynikte Partizaner Organizatsye, a World War II resistance organization in the Vilna Ghetto
 Field Post Office
 Fleet Post Office
 Florida Philharmonic Orchestra, in Fort Lauderdale, Florida, United States
 Follow-on public offer
 For position only
 FPO mark, a fruit product certification mark in India
 Freedom Party of Austria, a political party in Austria
 Freedom Party of Ontario, a political party in Canada
 Grand Bahama International Airport, in the Bahamas
 Franciscans of Primitive Observance